Tiit Vähi's first cabinet was in office in Estonia from 30 January 1992 to 22 October 1992, when it was succeeded by Mart Laar's first cabinet.

Members

This cabinet's members were the following:
 Tiit Vähi – Prime Minister
 Robert Närska – Minister of Interior Affairs
 Lennart Meri – Minister of Foreign Affairs
 Heido Vitsur – Minister of Economic Affairs
 Märt Rask – Minister of Justice Affairs
 Aavo Mölder – Minister of Agricultural Affairs

References

Cabinets of Estonia